In Position is a six track EP recorded by Irish band Turn in 2001. It was recorded by the band without any record company involvement after they left Infectious Records in 2000. In Position the song would later be re-recorded and appear on Turn's second full-length album, Forward (Turn album). The EP was a massive success for the band, securing them a strong following throughout Ireland and giving Turn two of their strongest songs, In Position and Heartattack.
However, shortly after the tour that followed the EP's release, original bass player, Gavin Fox left the group to join Scottish Rockers Idlewild.

Track listing 
 In Position
 Catch On You
 Heart Attack
 Every Mistake
 After We Go (Again)
 The Reprise

In Position on Irish Music Central

Album Line Up 

 Ollie Cole - Guitars, Vocals, Piano
 Ian Melady - Drums, vocals
 Gavin Fox - Bass

2001 EPs
Turn (band) albums